Mundulla is a town and a locality in south eastern South Australia.

The name of the town is derived from the Aboriginal word mantala meaning "place of thunder", referring to a rumbling sound made when trampling on the earth. The Council enquired about the spelling in 1965 and the Postmaster General proposed to change it to Mundalla in 1972, but this was not approved by the Geographical Names Board.

At the 2016 census, the locality had a population of 436 of which 314 lived in its town centre.

The Mundulla school opened in 1878. An Australian rules football club, Mundulla Football Club, compete in the Kowree Naracoorte Tatiara Football League.

In 2016 Mundulla was the subject of an episode of Back Roads.

Heritage listings

Mundulla has a number of heritage-listed sites, including:
 Lot 30 Jewell Street: Wirrega Council Chambers
 22 Nalang Road: Old Mundulla Hotel

Mundulla Yellows
Mundulla Yellows is a disease fatal to (especially) eucalypts, characterised by all leaves on a limb turning yellow then dying. It was first observed in this area in the 1970s, and has since been observed in every other State including Tasmania. Of unknown cause/s, it has several peculiar attributes: slow irreversible progression towards death and presence of unaffected trees among the dead and dying.

References

External links

Towns in South Australia
Limestone Coast